Central United Methodist Church is a historic church at 233 N. Church Street in Spartanburg, South Carolina.

It was built in the 1880s, and remodeled in 1896 by architect George F. Barber.  It was added to the National Register in 2003.

References

Methodist churches in South Carolina
Churches on the National Register of Historic Places in South Carolina
Gothic Revival church buildings in South Carolina
Churches completed in 1896
19th-century Methodist church buildings in the United States
Churches in Spartanburg County, South Carolina
National Register of Historic Places in Spartanburg, South Carolina
Buildings and structures in Spartanburg, South Carolina